Ceromitia glandularis is a species of moth of the  family Adelidae. It is known from Malawi.

References

Adelidae
Endemic fauna of Malawi
Lepidoptera of Malawi
Moths of Sub-Saharan Africa
Moths described in 1908